Teresa Solana i Mir (born 15 May 1962 in Barcelona, Spain) is a contemporary Spanish writer of crime fiction in Catalan. She studied philosophy and the Classics at Universitat de Barcelona. Her work has been translated to English, French, German, Esperanto, Italian and Spanish.

Teresa Solana started her professional career as a translator, mainly from French and English. She was the director of the translation center in Tarassona between 1998 and 2004. She also wrote various articles and essays on translation.

In 2006 she published her first novel, Un crim imperfecte, for which she received the Premi Brigada 21 prize. This is the first story in which there appear the twin investigators Eduard and Borja Masdéu. Afterwards she published Drecera al paradís with the same protagonists. In 2010 she published her first, and up to now only, short story collection, Set casos de sang i fetge i una història d'amor. In 2013 she participated in the Edgar Allan Poe Award with the story 'Natura quasi morta 41'. She also published the novel Negres tempestes in which for the first time stars the investigator Norma Forester and with which she won the 3rd Premi Crims de Tinta prize. In 2011 she published L'hora del zen, another story with Eduard and Borja as protagonists. In early 2014 there appeared her seventh novel, La casa de les papallones, protagonized by Norma Forester. Campanes de boda (2016) includes the twin investigators again. Matèria grisa, also a crime novel, won the 19th Premi Roc Boronat prize.

Bibliography
 "Un crim imperfecte", 2006. 
 "Drecera al paradís", 2007. 
 "Set casos de sang i fetge i una història d'amor", 2010.
 "Negres tempestes", 2010.
 "L'hora zen", 2011.
 "La casa de les papallones", 2014.
 "Campanades de boda", 2016.
 "Matèria grisa", 2017.

Translated into English
 A Not So Perfect Crime, 2008. London: Bitter Lemon Press. Translated by Peter Bush. 
 A Shortcut to Paradise, 2011. London: Bitter Lemon Press. Translated by Peter Bush. 
 The Sound of One Hand Killing, 2013. London: Bitter Lemon Press. Translated by Peter Bush. 
 Crazy Tales of Blood and Guts, 2013. London: Bitter Lemon Press. Translated by Peter Bush. 
 The First Prehistoric Serial Killer, 2018. London: Bitter Lemon Press. Translated by Peter Bush.

References

Catalan-language writers
English–Catalan translators
Translators from Catalonia
Spanish women novelists
Novelists from Catalonia
Short story writers from Catalonia
Writers from Barcelona
1962 births
Living people
21st-century Spanish novelists
Women writers from Catalonia
21st-century Spanish women writers
21st-century translators
Spanish crime fiction writers